The KMC Women Sports Complex, is located in Block-3, Gulshan-e-Iqbal, Karachi, Sindh, Pakistan.

History
The complex was established on August 12, 2005.

See also 
 List of sports venues in Karachi

References

Indoor arenas in Pakistan
Sports venues in Karachi
Women's sport in Pakistan
2005 establishments in Pakistan
Sports venues completed in 2005